

Seeds
A champion seed is indicated in bold text while text in italics indicates the round in which that seed was eliminated.

  Andy Roddick (champion)
  Andre Agassi (quarterfinals)
  Tommy Haas (quarterfinals)
  Nicolás Massú (first round)
  Taylor Dent (withdrew because of an ankle injury)
  Sébastien Grosjean (final)
  Jürgen Melzer (semifinals)
  Luis Horna (quarterfinals)

Draw

External links
 Main draw
 Qualifying draw

Singles